Disco Inferno is a 1970s jukebox musical written by Jai Sepple. Set in the East End of London in 1976, the show features songs from the era and is loosely based on the story of Faust.

Original productions
The musical debuted at the Queens Theatre, Hornchurch in 1999 with revised revivals at the Towngate Theatre, Basildon in 2004 the Kenneth More Theatre, Ilford in 2006.

Character list
The characters in Disco Inferno were named after well-known characters from songs of the era, such as "Jumpin' Jack Flash", "Wuthering Heights" and "Lady Marmalade".

 Jack - a young and impressionable wannabe 'superstar'
 Jane - Jack's devoted girlfriend / fiancée
 Tom - Jack's lifelong and slightly nerdish best friend
 Maggie - Tom's girlfriend and female equivalent
 Heathcliffe - an egotistical, malevolent singer in the 'Disco Inferno'
 Kathy - Heathcliffe's long-suffering girlfriend
 Terry - Smooth talking DJ and friend to Jack and Tom
 Duke - an aging rocker and owner of the nightclub
 Lady Marmalade - the femme fatale
 Nick Diablo - eccentric English fashion guru
 Lily - a flamboyant barman

The character of Nick Diablo was omitted from both the 2006 and 2012 productions and Lily were omitted from the 2012 UK tour. Some of the characters names' were changed in the 2012 UK tour: Lady Marmalade was renamed Lucretia MacEvil, Kathy was renamed Roxanne and Terry was renamed Billy.

Original casts

Plot synopsis
The show is set in London in 1976; the hottest summer on record. Disco Inferno tells the story of an ambitious and talented hopeful, Jack, and his "burning" desire to make it in the music industry. Working late in a London nightclub, Jack meets Lucretia McEvil – a femme fatale and incarnation of the Devil. Dreaming of becoming successful, he makes a Faustian pact with her, trading his soul to fulfill his wildest fantasies.

Jack soon becomes an international success, making appearances on radio and television shows, but success proves hollow. He has the fame and fortune he's always dreamed of but is losing something far more important – his devoted girlfriend, Jane. One disaster quickly follows another. If only he could turn back time... If only he could make one more deal, trading all he now has for something far more important... the love of his life.

Performances
Disco Inferno has been performed around the world since it initial debut, countries have included the United Kingdom, Hong Kong, Singapore, China, Jamaica, Sweden, New Zealand, Australia, Pakistan and Norway.

Music
Generally due to copyright restrictions in different countries songs have varied from production to production. The 2012 UK Tour version of the script was considerably revised.

2004 London premiere

Act One
 Overture (Instrumental)
 Celebration / Night To Remember (Jack & Company)
 If You Leave Me Now (Heathcliffe, Kathy, Jane & Jack)
 You Got What It Takes (Heathcliffe)
 Space Oddity / I Lost My Heart To A Starship Trooper (Terry & Company)
 Crocodile Rock (Duke, Jack, Tom & Terry)
 Kissing in the Back Row (Tom & Company)
 Hot Stuff (Lady Marmalade & Acolytes)
 Some Girls (Tom & Guys)
 You to Me Are Everything (Jack, Jane & Company)
 Streetlife (Kathy)
 Village People Medley (Terry, Tom, Jack & Company)
 Brown Eyed Girl (Jack & Company)
 Leader of the Gang (Heathcliffe)
 Pop Muzik (Nick Diablo & Company)
 Money Money Money (Jane, Kathy & Girls)
 Don't Stop Me Now (Jack & Company)

Act Two
 Whole Lotta Lovin' (Instrumental)
 Waterloo (Abba)
 Do Ya Think I'm Sexy (Jack & Company)
 Angel Eyes (Jane & Company)
 Staying Alive Medley (Jack & Company)
 This Is It (Maggie & Company)
 Don't Stop Me Now (Jack & Company)
 I Will Survive (Jane)
 Sorry Seems To Be The Hardest Word (Jack)
 Enough Is Enough (Kathy & Jane)
 Don't Give Up on Us Baby (Jack & Jane)
 Tragedy (Jack, Lady Marmalade & Company)
 Fire (Duke & Company)
 Saturday Night's Alright For Fighting (Heathcliffe & Lady Marmalade)
 Disco Inferno (Jack, Jane & Company)

2006 London revival

Act One
 Overture (Instrumental)
 Celebration (Jack & Company)
 If You Leave Me Now (Heathcliffe, Kathy, Jane & Jack)
 You Got What It Takes (Heathcliffe)
 Crocodile Rock (Duke, Jack, Tom & Terry)
 Kissing in the Back Row (Tom & Company)
 Hot Stuff (Lady Marmalade & Acolytes)
 You to Me Are Everything (Jack, Jane & Company)
 Streetlife (Kathy)
 Boogie Medley (Terry, Tom, Jack & Company)
 Could It Be Magic (Jack & Company)
 Ballroom Blitz (Heathcliffe)
 Money Money Money (Jane, Kathy & Girls)
 Don't Stop Me Now (Jack & Company)

Act Two
 Killer Queen (Lady Marmalade & Acolytes)
 Waterloo (Abba)
 I Was Made for Dancing (Jack & Company)
 The Winner Takes It All (Jane)
 Staying Alive Medley (Jack & Company)
 This Is It (Maggie & Company)
 Don't Stop Me Now (Jack & Company)
 I Will Survive (Jane)
 Sorry Seems to Be the Hardest Word (Jack)
 Enough Is Enough (Kathy & Jane)
 Don't Give Up on Us Baby (Jack & Jane)
 Tragedy / Bohemian Rhapsody (Jack, Lady Marmalade & Company)
 Devil Woman (Jack & Company)
 Still I'm Sad (Maggie & Company)
 Saturday Night's Alright For Fighting (Heathcliffe & Lady Marmalade)
 Play That Funky Music (Jack & Company)
 Disco Inferno (Jack, Jane & Company)

2012 UK Tour

Act One
 Overture (Instrumental)
 The Best Disco in Town (Heathcliffe & Company)
 Hold Me Close (Jack & Jane)
 You Got What It Takes (Heathcliffe)
 Old Time Rock n Roll (Duke)
 Hot Stuff (Lucretia & Acolytes)
 Let's Make a Deal / Signed, Sealed, Delivered I'm Yours (Lucretia & Acolytes)
 Boogie Shoes (Tom, Jack, Billy & Male Company)
 You to Me Are Everything (Jack, Jane & Company)
 Call Me (Roxanne)
 Relight My Fire (Jack & Company)
 Hell Raiser (Heathcliffe)
 I've Got the Music in Me / Disco Inferno (Jack & Company)

Act Two
 Entr'Acte / Radio Montage (Instrumental)
 Lucretia MacEvil (Lucretia & Acolytes)
 Whole Lotta Lovin' (Instrumental)
 Y.M.C.A. (Village People)
 Shake Your Groove Thing (Jack & Company)
 If I Can't Have You (Jane)
 I'm in the Mood for Dancing (Maggie, Tom & Company)
 Boogie Medley (Jack & Company)
 I Will Survive (Jane)
 Baby Come Back (Jack & Company)
 Disco Inferno / Night on Disco Mountain (Instrumental)
 Don't Give Up on Us Baby / It's Too Late (Jack & Jane)
 Devil Woman (Jack, Lucretia & Acolytes)
 Highway to Hell (Jack)
 Still I'm Sad (Maggie & Company)
 Spirit in the Sky (Jack, Tom & Company)
 Saturday Night's Alright For Fighting (Heathcliffe & Lucretia)
 Devil's Gun (Heathcliffe, Lucretia & Acolytes)
 Disco Inferno (Jack, Jane & Company)
 Megamix (Company)

Publishing and representation
Disco Inferno is published by various Musical Theatre publishers worldwide.

 UK - Musical Theatre International, MTI Europe
 US - Musical Theatre International, MTI
 Europe - Gallissas Verlag
 Australia / New Zealand - David Spicer Productions

Cancelled UK tour
A new version of Disco Inferno began a tour of the UK in the autumn of 2012. The cast included Sam Attwater as 'Jack', Dani Harmer as 'Jane' and Javine Hylton as 'Lucretia MacEvil'. The tour closed after the first week, with the producer citing 'financial problems'.

External links
 The Official Disco Inferno Website
 Jai Sepple - Author's official homepage
 Disco Inferno on the Guide to Musical Theatre

References

2012 musicals
2006 musicals
2004 musicals
Jukebox musicals
British musicals